The 1922 North Dakota gubernatorial election was held on November 7, 1922. Incumbent Republican Ragnvald Nestos defeated Nonpartisan League nominee William Lemke with 57.65% of the vote.

Primary elections
Primary elections were held on June 28, 1922.

Republican primary

Candidates
Ragnvald Nestos, incumbent Governor
Bert F. Baker, State Senator
Harvey L. Stegner

Results

General election

Candidates
Ragnvald Nestos, Republican
William Lemke, Democratic

Results

References

1922
North Dakota
Gubernatorial